The many characters portrayed in The Night Angel Trilogy, a series of three books in the fantasy genre written by Brent Weeks, revolve around the story of the main protagonist Azoth. Azoth adopts different identities such as Kylar Stern and Kagé. Other key characters are Azoth's mentor Durzo Blint (Acaelus Thorne), the gentle Elene Cromwyll (Doll Girl), and the rapist Rat (Roth Ursuul).

Protagonists

Azoth
The enigmatic anti-hero (and main protagonist) of the series, Azoth is the jaded product of a childhood spent on the streets scrounging to survive. Originally he is part of the Black Dragon Guild, a poorly established group of adolescent thieves, divided into 'Bigs' and 'Littles' (adolescents and young children). During the part of the novels spent in Azoth's youth, he is considered a 'Little'. There is quite a measure of foreshadowing in the strongly antithetical relationship between Azoth and Rat, the Fist (or second-in-command) of the Black Dragon who is out for revenge against Azoth for slights against him. Even though they have both seen the cruelest side of the world's face, Azoth chose to temper himself with a sense of justice, rightful vengeance, and mercy, whereas Rat fell to corruption and sadism. Early on Azoth displays the characteristics of a just young man born to the wrong circumstances. It has been discussed that the theme of the Night Angel is introduced during the initial book in the first three characters: Azoth, who represents vengeance, Jarl, who represents justice, and Elene/Doll Girl, who represents Mercy. These two influential characters shape Azoth to be who he is. Eventually the perceived weakness of inaction is left behind Azoth as he adopts his new persona of Kylar Stern. Azoth refers to a mythical substance found in Alchemy, capable of performing miraculous healing effects, but the novel refers to it as an old word for quicksilver and often comments that it is an unusual name for an orphan of the slum.

Kylar Stern
The identity Azoth assumes after apprenticing under Durzo Blint. As Durzo's apprentice, he learns the ways of a wetboy. Sent to the Drakes' to learn how to be a noble, he makes new friends and enemies. Kylar means "one who kills and who is killed" or "Undying Dier". The pun being that Kylar Stern means "The stern undying dier." For the most part, Kylar learns that he is what is called broken—meaning that he is unable to tap into his Talent even though his body holds an enormous amount of that magic. However, Kylar later learns that he is what is known as a ka'karifer—meaning that he was one of the few people who could bond with a ka'kari. The black ka'kari chooses him to be its new master and it grants him amazing powers, not the least of which is allowing him to tap into his long-hidden Talent by bridging the hole in his Talent. The black ka'kari makes him immortal but not invincible, meaning that every time he dies, he will come back from the dead; the price of this (that he only learns much later in the story) is high, as each time he dies and returns, one of his loved ones will die in his place. His other powers are that of other wetboys, such as altered strength and speed, invisible hands he uses to push or grab things from a distance, and to turn invisible—which is considered the epitome of a wetboy.

The ka'kari not only gives Kylar immortality it also allows him a certain degree of control over blue flame, which he uses to scare people. In the third book it is shown that the ka'kari can talk to Kylar and has the power to grow Kylar a black ka'kari hand after he lost it in the second book, but it likes to devour Kylar's clothes and weapons without his permission at the same time.

Kagé
Kagé is the name Kylar uses when he competes in the tournament hosted by the Sa'Kage early in the series. This name is later used in Kylar's trial for the death of Terah Graesin, as an alias.

The Night Angel
The Night Angel is introduced in the series as a deity governing the forces of Vengeance, Justice, and Mercy culminating as the Avatar of Retribution. As the story unfolds, however, the Night Angel is revealed to be the identity of the bearer of the black ka'kari. The Night Angel is immortal and can "devour" both inanimate objects (except for the magic artifacts Curoch and Iures) and magic with a touch of the black ka'kari. It can suppress the magic of anything it covers, including Curoch and Iures. Being the owner of the black ka'kari, Kylar Stern has donned this persona to drive fear to anyone that sees him, or when he loses to his emotions.

Durzo Blint
Azoth's master during his time as a wetboy apprentice. His name was originally meant to be spoken as Durzo Flint, however, during a bout of drunkenness, repeated it as Blint, and has never bothered correcting it. Durzo is over seven centuries old, and has been known by an array of names during this time, most famously (and originally) as the Prince Acaelus Thorne during the time of Jorsin Alkestes. He was the bearer of the black Ka'Kari, and is one of the best, if not the best swordsman ever to walk the earth. Possesses the ability to change his appearance at will. He has a daughter named Ulyssandra by Gwinvere. The reason he lost the black Ka'Kari, which takes its strength from love, was because he finally found the antithesis to it: indifference.

Durzo was killed by Kylar shortly after the Khalidoran coup, when the black Ka'Kari left Durzo for Kylar. After being killed, Durzo returns in Beyond The Shadows as he was given life again by the Wolf, "for old time's sake," as the Wolf puts it. With his new life, Durzo says he has to leave to go be with Gwinvere, but ends up joining the battle of Black Barrow against Khali and the Krul. After the battle, he leaves to find Gwinvere and his daughter Ulyssandra.

Gaelan Starfire
One of the names used by Acaelus Thorne who is also Durzo Blint during a lifetime. Gaelan is famous for his great deeds in history. It is said that he threw the blue ka'kari into the sea, creating the Tlaxini Maelstrom.

Ferric Fireheart
One of the names used by Acaelus Thorne during a lifetime. It is said that he threw the red ka'kari into the heart of Mount Tenji, making it an active volcano.

Master Tulii
The name Durzo uses when he is with the Drake family.

Acaelus Thorne
The best friend of Emperor Jorsin Alkestes, Acaelus was highly regarded and trusted by all who knew him and was known as a supreme warrior with an even stronger sense of justice. When the time for war came in the land, it was thought that Jorsin slighted Acaelus when he gave his Ka'Kari to the generals in army. After this apparent act of betrayal by Jorsin, all records of Acaelus ceased to exist in the land. The true events of that day though, are much different. What was done in reality was that Jorsin had given Acaelus the most difficult task of all, that being the bearer of the Black Ka'Kari, and the name Night Angel. As the Night Angel, it became his job to watch those who bore the other Ka'Kari for signs of corruption and take their Ka'Kari if necessary. Over the years, Acaelus has been known by many names and has participated in every major war in the history of Midcyru. His most recent incarnation is Durzo Blint, Wetboy of Cenaria. In Beyond the Shadows, it is revealed that he was to marry Trace the day he became the Night Angel, leaving her alone at the altar. He has been known by several names throughout history, including: Gaelan Starfire, Ferric Fireheart, Garric Shadowbane, Hrothran Steelbender, Vin Craysin, Tal Drakkan, Yric the Black, Zak Eurthkin, Rebus Nimble, Qos Delanoesh, X!rutic Ur, Mir Graggor, Pips McClawski, Dav Slinker, Oturo Kenji, Dehvirahaman ko Bruhmaeziwakazari, and Durzo Blint.

Doll Girl
Elene as a young girl.  She grew up with Azoth and Jarl and was known as a mute until she cried out at Azoth to not leave her as he left to apprentice with Durzo.  Her face is mutilated by Rat, as a warning to Azoth when he began to gain followers in the Black Dragon to join his sub-guild the lizards.  She is later named Elene by the Cromwylls when she comes to live with them.

Elene Cromwyll
Doll Girl when she grows up. She is given this name by the family Kylar sends her to live with.  Although her face is scarred, she possesses an inner beauty which is reflected through her gentleness and kindness.  She leaves Cenaria with Kylar to start a new life and become herbalists.  After Kylar leaves to save Logan, she is kidnapped and is able to understand Kylar after she does not regret killing an evil Khalidoran to save an innocent boy. Early on in the third book Kylar and Elene learn that Elene is intended to be the latest sacrifice for Kylar to maintain his immortality. Although Kylar is guilty, as he allowed himself to be executed to protect Logan's reputation without knowing the cost of coming back to life, Elene views it as a noble sacrifice to allow Kylar to live. As a favor to Kylar, Wolf promises to wait 6 months before Elene will die. At the end of the 6 months and upon learning she is pregnant with Kylar's child Elene flees and submits herself to the Goddess Khali, becoming her new host body. Kylar and the others present are forced to pool their Talent together and kill Khali while in Elene's body.

Jarl
Azoth's best friend from the Warrens.  He stashed money in a sash on his tunic in hopes of one day leaving the Warrens.  In response to Azoth gaining followers in the Black Dragon in an attempt to challenge Rat for leadership, he was raped by Rat and forced to become one of his "girls".  Jarl was later picked by Momma K to become her successor to the Sa'Kage.  After the Khalidoran coup, Jarl opened the Sa'Kage to go legitimate in Cenaria, and orchestrated the events leading to the Nocta Hemata, also known as the Night of Blood.  Before he could see his plans come to fruition however, he was killed by Vi while attempting to bring Kylar back in the Sa'Kage to help assassinate the Godking.  His death is the second death for Kylar's immortality, after he allowed himself to be killed for money to help support Elene and Uly.

Logan Gyre
Logan is the son of Duke Gyre and Catrinna Gyre. The Duke names Logan as the head of the family after he is sent to the Screaming Winds, an outpost in one of the few passes on the Cenarian/Khalidoran border, by Niner. Solonariwan Tofusin becomes his adviser, and during this time he also becomes friends with Kylar.

Logan is betrothed to Count Drake's daughter Serah, leading the disapproval of many nobles that he is marrying below his station, as the marriage would set back the Gyre family from the throne for many generations. To save the kingdom from civil war after the king will likely be assassinated, Lord General Agon convinces Logan to marry the king's daughter, Jenine, at the banquet just before the Khalidoran's attack. In order to save the lives of Logan and Jenine, Lord General Agon beheads the King so that royal guards will protect Logan as the Prince Heir. It is an unsuccessful bid however, as the Khalidoran's capture Logan and "kill" Jenine. While being led into the Maw, Logan escapes with the help of a Sa'Kage member disguised as a guard, but is forced to jump into the Hole. Killing the guard guarding the entrance to the Hole, Logan takes his key, and jumps in.

Logan spends at least three months in the hole. He manages to make friends with an unintelligent mute with filed teeth named Gnasher. Gnasher became loyal to Logan when he noticed a malformation in Gnasher's jaw, and rubbed the joints, relieving him of the pain.  He also gains the friendship of Lilly, the Hole prostitute.  Before his freedom from the Hole, he pardoned Lilly of the crimes that brought her to it.  In an attempt to leave the Hole, he manages to get all of the occupants of The Hole to co-operate in an escape attempt. The attempt ultimately failed, with the key to the Hole falling into the hole where the Holers kicked their waste into. After being attacked by Fin, the leader of the Holer's, and killing him by pushing into the waste hole, the Holers attempt to use Fin's rope to climb down into the hole to find the key with Logan and Gnasher leading the group.  Distractions from Khalidoran soldiers from above distract the Holer's and they eventually let go of the rope, trapping the men.  While there, they find the key, but also find Fin who was still alive.  Gnasher kills Fin by ripping his leg off.  They are discovered by Kylar in the pit, who had heard a rumor that Logan was still alive and in the Hole.

After escaping he rides to Terah Graesin's encampment of rebels and Pledges his service to her but eventually becomes the king of Ceneria and then onto becoming the High King.

Jenine Gyre
The daughter of King Aleine, she was given to Logan in marriage during the banquet leading up to the Khalidoran coup.  She was supposedly killed by Roth in the coup, but was saved by Neph Dada.  She is taken to Khalidor to become a concubine for the Godking, but is rescued by Dorian and becomes his queen when Dorian takes the Godking's throne.  She is later rescued by Cenarian troops as Dorian slips into madness during the battle of Black Barrow and taken back to Logan to be his queen, and is pregnant with both Dorian's son, and Kylar and Elene's son (who was transferred into her womb via Dorian's spellweaving).

Count Rimbold Drake
A once rich noble and former member of the Sa'Kage Nine.  He employed Durzo as his personal assassin during his early years with the Sa'Kage.  He later abandoned his life as one of the Nine and began to follow the one God.  Durzo and he are still good friends and it's with his aid that he helps turn Azoth into Kylar Stern.  Drake also took in Blue so she could be raised as a lady to escape the Warrens.

Viridiana Sovari
Vi was the former apprentice of the wetboy Hu Gibbet, often considered second only to Durzo. She is introduced as a remarkably attractive young woman, but one whose sexually abused past has degraded her respect for her body, which she uses as a tool to her advantage on missions. In the first novel, she attempts to use this strategy to kill Kylar, but fails thanks to Logan's father. She spends much of the second novel under the secret control of the Godking, who has placed a compulsion spell on her. At the Godking's behest, she assassinates Jarl, her only friend, kidnaps Uly, and steals Kylar's wedding rings. The rings are ancient earrings, with a powerful compulsion spell. The spell creates a nearly unbreakable bond between the wearers. Later, she aids Kylar in a mission to assassinate the Godking, and finds herself falling in love with him. In their climactic confrontation, she is forced to bind herself to Kylar with the rings in order overwrite the Godking's control over her. This allows her and Kylar to kill the Godking but causes extreme rage on Kylar's part. Later it is discovered that the effects of the rings can be partially suppressed with immense focus and Vi uses this to enable Kylar to marry Elene, despite Vi's feelings for him. By the end of the third book, Vi loves Kylar and remains at his side to support him. She is immensely Talented and later becomes a sister of the Chantry. She is offered the position of Speaker but turns it down.

Solonariwan Tofusin
More commonly known as Solon Tofusin. Solon is a prince of the Island Empire of Seth and an exceptionally strong red mage. Solon left Seth and his beloved to follow a prophecy made by his friend Dorian. Leaving his brother as king, who abused his power and squandered the countries wealth.

During the coup in Cenaria, Solon uses Curoch to kill dozens of meisters and Vürdmeisters present at the castle. After using Curoch, his hair starts to grow in white. In the end, Solon returns to his homeland of Seth to find Kaede, his beloved, is engaged to marry another man. After being locked in jail and later killing the liaison, Solon asks a way to prove himself to Kaede. She orders him to kill the rest of her now dead fiance's family. He sets out immediately, even through the winter storms, he conquers them all with the help of a crazy crew and gains the nickname "Stormrider". After his success, he marries Kaede, becoming king of the Sethi. As he says, "I would say Emperor, but as of 10 years ago, we have no more colonies, so 'Emperor' is a tad pretentious"

Feir Cousat
Feir is friends with Dorian and Solon. Out of the three he is the least skilled at magic, but he is a Maker and a Blademaster of the second Echelon. After Kylar throws Curoch into Ezra's Woods, he goes in to retrieve it. When he wakes up, he cannot remember what happened to him, but during his time in the Wood he received instructions to forge a new sword which turns out to be the Ceurans' sacred blade Ceur'caelestus. Feir is the first known man to have left Ezra's Wood alive.

Dorian Ursuul
Dorian is one of the few people who are trained as both a mage and a meister. He is a Sa'seuran (Lord of Fire) and a Hoth'salar (Brother of Healing) and once a Vurdmeister of the 12th shu'ra. He has the gift of prophecy, but damages his gift before the siege at Screaming Winds, lest it falls into the hands of Khali. He expected it to take years for his power to return, though it heals much faster than he expected: after just a few months, his  power begins to return. He is the son of Godking Garoth Ursuul. After the Godking's death, he takes his place as Godking Wanhope, so that Southron mages will not know of his reign. Although he tries to change the ways of Khalidor, he ultimately gives in to many temptations. Wanhope means despair. He loses his title and appears to go insane after wielding Curoch and Iures in order to stop the Krull army.

Prior to his heroics, Dorian transfers the embryo of Kylar and Elene's child into the womb of his wife Jenine, hereby fulfilling his vision that Jenine gave birth to twins. During Elene's funeral, Vi realizes this truth and catches the eye of Dorian who simply smiles back at her.

It has been theorized that Dorian did not go insane after wielding both Iures and Curoch but for the good of the kingdom allowed people to believe that he did. His demeanor during the funeral suggests that he had more wits about him than people believed and that he may in the future become an Ezra-type of character.

Lord General Brant Agon
An experienced Cenarian general. During the Khalidorian coup, he beheaded a poisoned and crazed King Aleine Gunder IX to save Logan.  After rounding up a small group of men, he inadvertently fell into a trap set by Roth Ursuul who killed the men and crippled Agon.  After the coup, Agon approached the Cenarion Sa'Kagé and offered his help in training troops to resist the Khalidorans and take back the city. He later became a trusted general under Logan Gyre, and the men he trained take up the banner as Agon's Dogs.

Duke Regnus Gyre
Husband of Catrinna Gyre and father to Logan Gyre.  He was forced to marry Catrinna after his betrothed, Nalia, was given in marriage the King Aleine Gunder.  Regnus refused Agon's proposal to take the throne by force after King Davin died.  After the coronation of King Aleine, Aleine sent him off to the Screaming Winds to defend against the Khalidorans.  During this time, Solon leaves Logan and goes to his father, only to be dismissed by Regnus the day before his family is killed by Hu Gibbet in the attack on the Gyre family.  He later dies with the queen.

Gwinvere Kirena
Known as Momma K to the Warrens, she is known as the Mistress of Pleasures for the Sa'Kage and is its true Shinga.  The fact she is the Shinga is known by only few people, as she elects to have puppet Shinga's in her place, the latest being the Pon Dradin.  She later trains Jarl to be her replacement as she seeks to retire from the Sa'Kage.  After Jarl is assassinated, she takes the role of Shinga again and leads the Nocta Hemata against the Khalidoran occupation of Cenaria.  It is later revealed that she is in love with Durzo Blint.  Her sister is Vonda Kirena, once Durzo's lover, who was killed when he chose personal gain over love.  Before Logan and the Cenarian army go off the Black Barrow, she is granted an official title as Duchess Kirena, establishing herself an official House in Cenaria.

Ulyssandra
The daughter of Durzo Blint and Gwinvere Kirena, but she is adopted by Kylar Stern and Elene Cromwyll after the events of The Way of Shadows. She is immensely Talented and later becomes a sister of the Chantry. She is hypothesized to be the new Speaker.

Ariel Wyant
A Sister from the Chantry who possesses both high intelligence and high Talent, making her a formidable scholar and maja. While she appears to be uninterested in politics and always eager to promote the Chantry's position, she sometimes follows her own agenda. Ariel's sister is the Speaker Istariel Wyant.

Lantano Garuwashi
Hailed as one of the best warriors in Midcyru, it seemed fate played a cruel joke on Lantano.  Born of peasant blood and known only as an "iron sword", due to his birth, he is unable to move up the ranks in Ceura, who base their rank upon the status of birth.  He comes upon Feir, who has Curoch disguised as Ceur'caelestos, who is pretending to be a messenger of the gods.  Lantano challenges Feir and during the exchange, Lantano's iron sword breaks and Curoch leaves Feir to reside upon the hilt of his old blade.  Lantano and his men take this as a sign that he is the prophesied king of Ceura.  Kylar later attempts to take the blade by a duel with Lantano, but after failing, tricks Lantano and throws the blade into Ezra's Woods.  Feir ventures into the Woods to obtain the sword, but instead returns with the sword's hilt only (he was given instructions, supposedly by the Dark Hunter, upon how to make Ceur'caelestos). Feir returns to Lantano just before the battle of Black Barrow with the newly forged Ceur'caelestos.  However, due to a lack of a ruby to produce the fire necessary to make Ceur'caelestos legitimate, all seems lost and the sword will fail inspection by the Regent of Ceura.  Solon appears just before the Regent inspects the blade with a ruby allowing it to bond with Ceur'caelestos and passing the test by the Regent, making Lantano the new King of Ceura.

Antagonists

Rat
Azoth's former Guild Fist. He collected the Black Dragons' guild dues every week, and beat anyone who came up short. When Azoth first defied him, he raped Jarl, and when Azoth started gaining followers, he beat Doll Girl and cut scars into her face. When he tried to rape Azoth, Azoth drowned him as his initiation for Durzo.

Roth Ursuul
Revealed to be Rat as an adult, he escaped death thanks to Neph Dada, but lost an ear as punishment for almost being killed by Kylar as a child. He is revealed to be one of the bastard sons of God King Garoth Ursuul and was planted in the city in order to take over the Sa'kage and overthrow the government. A cruel sadist and implied cannibal who enjoys shooting arrows into starving mobs for sport, Roth threatens Momma K with the life of her daughter (though believing she is her niece) and forces her to help him seize control of Cenaria and murders several of the nobles as part of the takeover by Khalidor, while attempting to murder Kylar and steal his Ka'kari from him as a gift to his father. Roth is killed by Kylar using the Ka'kari, but slays Kylar as well. This is Kylar's first death as an immortal.

Neph Dada
One of Godking Garoth Ursuul's most powerful Vürdmeisters. Neph Dada was the tutor of Roth Ursuul.  While he remains yet loyal to the Godking, he had hoped to bring Khali back to the realm of the living and with her help, become the next Godking.  He was able to have Iures, disguised as Retribution, successfully stolen from Kylar while he was at the Chantry.  Once in his possession, he was able to unravel the weaves created by Jorsin that kept the Krul army in stasis.  While he was successful in bringing Khali back into the living realm, he was split in half by Kylar using Curoch.

King Aleine "Niner" Gunder IX
King Aleine comes to power after his predecessor, King Davin, passes on.  Known to the citizens as "Niner", he is very paranoid and weak minded, with the amusing ability to know only variations of the word shit when cursing.  During the celebration before the Khalidoran coup, Durzo poisons his drink with a potion that makes him laugh continuously, leading the rest of the nobles to discover they have been poisoned as well.  Due to the death of Prince Aleine by Trudana Jadwin, he makes Logan the Crown Prince and gives him his daughter Jenine in marriage.  In the ensuing confusion as the Khalidoran's attack, Niner forbids the royal guard from protecting Logan and Jenine, leading General Agon to behead him so Logan can be protected.

Godking Garoth Ursuul
Khalidor's powerful, cunning, and ruthless Godking during the invasion of Cenaria. Had plans for the conquest of all Midcyru and planned to start by subjugating Cenaria.  He had many sons through various concubines but killed those he deemed unworthy. He is a manipulative, psychopathic, misogynistic sadist, but also has a formidable mind. The Godking's plans, powers, resources and goals extend further than even most of his servants realize and he is almost always one step ahead of his enemies. He sought to obtain a ka'kari for himself in order to survive a brain tumor that was slowly killing him. However, it was not until he saw Kylar rise from death that he knew the full extent of the ka'kari's power. He was eventually killed by Vi and Kylar, prompting the Khalidoran retreat from Cenaria and a subsequent power struggle between his heirs.

Terah Graesin
Duchess of House Graesin.  With the Khalidoran coup, and Logan being presumed dead, she assumes the title of Queen of Cenaria.  Power hungry and mad, she makes Logan swear his allegiance to her when he is freed from the Hole.  She is later discovered have an incestuous affair with her brother Luc and is responsible for the death of their sister Natassa, who discovered the affair.  She is killed by Kylar because of her sins, making Logan, King of Cenaria.  Logan sentences Kylar to death by the Wheel, one which Kylar refuses to escape due to the damage it would have on Logan's reputation.  This death becomes the fifth one Kylar experiences, and Kylar learns the price for his immortality from the Wolf.

Hu Gibbet
Regarded as the second best Wetboy in Cenaria after Durzo, and the master of Viridiana Sovari.  Hu is described as butcher, taking pleasure in spilling as much blood as possible, innocent or not, as an offering to his god Nysos. A violent and arrogant drug addict and murderer, he sleeps with several women and usually beats and murders them, but he claims to be in love with Vi despite frequently raping and beating her since she was a child.  He was responsible for the slaughter of Logan's family, and everyone in Gyre estate.  After the Khalidoran coup, he broke his oaths to the Sa'Kagé, and worked for the Godking.  After the events of Nocta Hemata, Hu attempts to kill a group of prostitutes at a safe house, but is killed by Kylar, who jams his head into a systems of gears.

Trudana Jadwin
Duchess of House Jadwin.  She killed Prince Aleine after a long running affair with him, not to mention also having an affair with his father, King Aleine. She is known to be very unattractive, but very good in bed. She murdered Prince Aleine after her attempt to seduce him.  During the Godking's rule, she signed the statues of all the Noble women and girls that he violated and killed, like they were a piece of her art.

Khali
The Goddess of Khalidor and gatekeeper (though not source) of the addictive and corrupting Vir magic that empowers their Vürdmesiters and Godkings, Khali is a powerful creature whose mere presence is extremely suffocating and oppressive even to the bearer of the black Ka'kari, and even at a distance. Use of the Vir binds the Vürdmesiter to Khali and prayers to Khali strengthen this further, but she is unable to sever a Vürdmesiter from the Vir. Khali draws powers from strong emotions and, finding suffering the easiest to generate, encouraged the Khalidorans to practice torture, rape and murder on a nationwide scale, and to make war with other nations. Non-Khalidors doubt she exist, while Vürdmesiters believe she is a senior  member of the Strangers; in reality, she is merely their ally, Her real name is Trace Avagulania, the ex-fiance of Acaelus Thorne and the bearer of the White Ka'kari, which grants immortality and supernatural glamour, causing everyone who sees her to worship her beauty. At some point she lost her body and could only communicate through corpses, but she attempted to convince the Vürdmesiters to give her a living body, which Neph Dada finally did when he granted her Elene, giving her enough power to resurrect and control the entire Khalidoran army of krul as well as the Titan and numerous other monsters. However, Elene tricked her and helped Kylar and Durzo destroy the White Ka'kari and kill her.

The Strangers
The Strangers are a race of supernatural creatures from another plane of existence that allied with the original Godking of Khalidor Roygaris Ursuul, giving him access to the Vir magic and serving, reluctantly, as the armies of his successors in the event they were summoned, assuming the Godking in question could control them. They are believed to be the Nephilim, fallen angels or the spirits of their offspring. Like Khali, they manifest by inhabiting the corpses of human sacrifices, though unlike her they have an intense, murderous hatred for the living, to the point where they would always kill prisoners even if told beforehand that their lives would be forfeit if they did, regardless of age or gender- though they killed children faster. They also eat human flesh and gain strength from that. Their number system is based on 13; this is where the suspicions about the number are thought to have come from. They are rigidly bound to those numbers. For example a meister can lead 12 krul himself, but if he wishes to lead 13 or more he must master a 13th (a Daemon), which is different and more difficult, though also more powerful. This ranking system continues through multiples of 13- and thus, multiple human sacrifices, also of 13, to give them corpses to inhabit- with the most powerful and high-ranked Stranger ever summoned, a Titan, requiring and leading 4,826,809 sacrifices / krul. In order, the hierarchy of the Strangers is Krul, Daemons (White Krul), Bone Lords, Fiends, Archanghuls and Night Lords, with Titans possibly more than a single rank about them. It is unknown if there is a rank above Titan, though the Khalidorans mistakenly believed that Khali was. Destroying an army of Strangers requires very powerful magic, and only sends them back to the plane whence they came.

Minor characters

Ja'laliel
Leader of the Black Dragon's when Kylar was a kid still going by the name Azoth.  He was the only person who Rat would obey.  His death from a severe lung disease allowed Rat to gain control of the Black Dragons. But after Rats supposed, "death" the guild of Black Dragon quickly vanished.

Pon Dradin
Puppet Shinga for the Sa'Kage, died of assassination.

Corbin Fishill
One of the Nine of the Sa'Kage.  He was in charge of the street guilds that operated in the Warrens.  He is killed by Durzo Blint upon allegations he is a Khalidoran spy.

Catrinna Gyre
Matriarch of the Gyre family.  After her husband, Regnus, is banished to the Screaming Winds by Niner, she attempts to gain control of the family from Logan, who was left in charge of the estate by Regnus.  Logan subjugates her into obeying him and keeps her confined to her room under guard.  She is later killed by Hu Gibbet during the attack on the Gyre family.

Vonda Kirena
Gwinvere's sister and Durzo's latest and most recently dead lover.  The two shared a dysfunctional relationship with each other, with Durzo seeing her almost as often as he saw her sister.  Vonda was kidnapped by Godking Garoth Ursuul as blackmail to make Durzo search for the Silver Ka'kari.  Durzo makes a choice between Vonda's life and the Silver Ka'kari and goes after the Silver Ka'kari, known as the Globe of Edges, which turns out to be a fake.  This act of condemning Vonda to death, for his own personal gain breaks the bond between the Black Ka'Kari and Durzo, with the Black Ka'Kari being bonded to Kylar.

Fergund Sa'fasti
Court mage of King Aleine IX, but does not possess much Talent and pretends to be a wise advisor and powerful mage.  He was last seen before the Khalidoran's attacked during the banquet.  He is presumed to be dead.

Devon Corgi
Devon is an ex-member of the Sa'Kage who took money from them when he left.  He becomes Kylar's first kill as an apprentice Wetboy.

Serah Drake
The oldest of Count Drake's three daughters. She killed herself after she was taken as a "comfort girl" for the Khalidoran army.  Her death is the first death for Kylar's immortality, when he was killed fighting Roth Ursuul. Her statue would be found in the Godkings bedchamber by Kylar and be put together on the bed with her sister Mags.  She was betrothed to Logan Gyre.

Ilena Drake
Count Drake's youngest daughter. Was infatuated with Kyler for a long time.

Mags Drake
A daughter of Count Drake.  She grew up with Elene and Kylar.  She attempts to kill Garoth Ursuul by willingly giving herself to him, but is killed when she attempts to kill Garoth Ursuul and herself by throwing them off the balcony of the Cenarian Castle.  She is later discovered by Kylar as one of many statues in the castle.  Her death came as the price for Kylar being brought back to life after being shot by a wetboy.

Ulana Drake
Count Drake's wife, and the one who inspired him to retire from the Sa'kage. Her death was the price for when Kylar was killed by the Godking.

Sister Drissa Nile
A skilled Healer of the Chantry living in Cenaria City with her husband, who is also a mage. She was present at the tournament Kylar participated in as Kage and told him of his lack of a conduit for his Talent to go through, and explained to him that the only way to restore his conduit was through a Ka'kari.  She heals Logan after he escape from the Hole, and is able to help partially lift the compulsion spell from Vi that the Godking placed on her.

Aristarchos ban Ebron
Ladeshian bard, member of the Society of the Second Dawn.

Blue
A second generation Black Dragon guild rat, she and her fellow guild members grew up hearing stories about Kylar from Momma K.  Kylar first encounters her when she attempts to steal money from him for guild dues.  The Black Dragons later ask Kylar to apprentice Blue as she deserves to be freed from the Warrens.  When Kylar asks why she should be apprenticed to him, she says she wants to kill the man who killed her friend Piggy reminding him at this age when Rat subdued Jarl and attacked Elene. Later Blue sees Kylar escape from the Gyre tomb after being killed on the wheel. In order to protect his sacrifice of getting Logan to be the king Kylar sends her off to Count Drake to be raised as a lady.

Antoninus Wervel
A powerful mage of Modaini descent, he travels with Feir to Black Barrow to create Ceur'caelestos.

Scarred Wrable
A respected Cenarian wetboy and one of Durzo's few friends. He is contracted by Terah Graesin to kill Durzo, not knowing it is Kylar disguised, and kills him with an arrow through the chest (to his own dismay), causing Kylar's third death as an immortal.  He is later contracted by Logan to rescue Kylar from his death at the Wheel, but Kylar refuses.  He was given his name due to the numerous scars on his body.  The scars are all self inflicted though he lets rumors circulate that he got them from the fighting pits. (He has one large scar running from the top of his chest to his belly button that he had etched into himself for 15 years that means idiot or halfwit. He didn't know what it meant but it was the only thing he remembered from a pendant he had as a child. Durzo later retrieved the pendant and tells him that he had been wearing it upside down and as such it actually was supposed to mean broken heart or one who takes half my heart. Supposedly a pendant that a war chief who give to his son.

Holers
Holers are the name for the criminals placed in the lowest cell of the Maw, called The Hole.  During his time of self imprisonment in the Hole, Logan makes friends and enemies there, who refer to him as "King", due to his claim he is King of Cenaria.  His only friends are Gnasher, a man with filed teeth who joined Logan after he massaged his jaws, relieving his pain, and Lilly, the Holer prostitute who survived by letting the Holer's use her body for pleasure, and kept Logan sane by talking with him.  Gnasher later escapes the Hole with Logan and remains by his side all the way to Black Barrow.  Lilly however, is turned into a Ferali by the Godking and attacks the Cenarians at Pavvil's Grove.  She is sent into the mountains to die peacefully by Logan after Kylar assassinates the Godking, allowing her to assume control and beg Logan to help her.

Logan's main enemy in the Hole is Fin, a man carried a long rope made of sinew from Holer's he killed.  He mocks Logan constantly and bullies the other Holers.  He falls into the waste hole in the middle of the Hole after being kicked in the nuts by the Hole prostitute, but survives because he holds his sinew rope and barely cushions his fall, and is later killed after Gnasher rips his leg off and he dies of blood loss. Other holers include Nine-Fingered Nick, Jake, Scab, Long Tom, Natassa Graesin and Tatts.

Lilly, Lilene Rauzana
Lilly is one of the holers before Logan's arrival.  Quickly befriending Logan, she tells him to “hold onto something good” so he does not lose himself to madness as others have. Lilly lets the men have sex with her as a way to survive in the hole. She is known to look worn and unattractive, but be in her twenties. After the first escape attempt, Lilly uses sex to lure Logan's enemy Fin near the Hole and kicks him in the nuts and causes him to fall into the waste hole. Lilly then convinces the other holers to hold the rope as Logan and Gnasher climb down into the hole to retrieve the key.  Before Logan steps into the hole he absolves Lilly of all her crimes.  Lilly is later turned into a ferali with the other holers.  Logan sees this when they are fighting in the battlefield and orders her to eat his enemies the Khalidorans instead of him and his army and then run into the mountains and she does this last thing for her king.

The Dark Hunter
The dark hunter resides in Ezra's wood. There it fights with Ezra 'the wolf'. He tells Kylar that it is his 'hubris'. At the start of 'Beyond the Shadows' Kylar lures a group of 5000 Lae'knaught into the woods and uses the hunter to kill them all. Ezra uses it to protect the artifacts of power that Kylar and Durzo threw into the woods. It imprints a mark on the items which allows it to track them for miles. The only thing able to conceal them is the Black Ka'kari. The dark hunter is a near invincible killing machine. In the last part of 'Beyond the Shadows' Kylar summons it to Black barrow by removing the Black Kakari from Curoch, thus allowing the Dark Hunter to sense its mark again, and using the dark hunter as one last being touching Curoch to complete a spell to kill all the krul. It seems to be incredibly fast.  It then retreats to the woods and has not been seen since

Historical characters

Jorsin Alkestes
The first High King of Midcryu.  One of the most, if not the most, powerful mage in history, he is responsible for the spell   that created Black Barrow, which was used to keep Khali and the Krul army trapped inside of it.

Ezra the Mad
Jorsin Alkestes' friend and a mage almost as powerful as (and probably more skilled than) Jorsin.
Ezra vanished in the Iaosian Forest which was later called Ezra's Wood, battling the Dark Hunter. He became immortal and resides in the Antechamber of Mystery where the bearers of the black ka'kari come after being killed. His battle against the Dark Hunter continues. The only time that Ezra is free of the Dark Hunter's influence is when it is asleep. Ezra appears to have a limited time that he is able to spend in the Antechamber of Mystery as he tells Kylar that restoring the arm that he lost will cost him time. He also refers to it when telling Kylar how he can appear to him outside of the Antechamber of
Mystery. It also seems that Ezra can trade some of his remaining time in order to give extra time to those who pay the Ka'kari's price for bringing Kylar back to life (the fact that one of Kylar's loved ones die each time he perishes as the Night Angel). Also known as The Wolf.

Roygaris Ursuul
A skilled Healer and contemporary of Jorsin and Ezra, Roygaris Ursuul allied himself with the Strangers to gain control over the vir and become Khalidor's first Godking.  He raised the largest army of undead krul ever created.  This army is later defeated by Jorsin Alkestes but not before Roygaris Ursuul transforms his body with magic.  It is said by Durzo that Roygaris turns himself into a monstrous killing machine named the Reaver.  The Reaver is said to be faster than thought.  Durzo was the first and possibly only one to wound it; the pockmarks on his face are proof of this as they were caused by the Reaver's acidic blood. It is believed that the Reaver is the infamous dark hunter, because it was led into Ezra's woods by Ezra himself and never heard from since.

Night Angel Trilogy
Characters in fantasy novel series of the 21st century